Simon Starling (born 1967) is an English conceptual artist and won the Turner Prize in 2005.

Early life
Simon Starling was born in 1967 in Epsom, Surrey. He studied photography and art at Maidstone College of Art from 1986 to 1987, then at Trent Polytechnic Nottingham from 1987 to 1990 and then attended Glasgow School of Art from 1990 to 1992.  From 1993 to 1996, he was a committee member of Transmission Gallery, Glasgow.

Work
Starling was the first recipient of the Blinky Palermo Grant in 1999. In 2005, he won the Turner Prize with the work, Shedboatshed that involved taking a wooden shed, turning it into a boat, sailing it down the Rhine and turning it back into a shed. Starling was short-listed for the Guggenheim's Hugo Boss Prize for contemporary art in 2004.

Exhibitions

His work is in the permanent collection of distinguished museums, such as the Tate Modern, London; Moderna Museet, Stockholm; Solomon R. Guggenheim Museum, New York; Kroller Muller Museum, Netherlands; San Francisco Museum of Modern Art; Museum of Contemporary Art, Chicago; and Museum Folkwang, Essen. Starling has had solo exhibitions at numerous international venues including ‘Simon Starling: At Twilight’, Japan Society, New York (2016), Thyssen-Bornemisza Contemporary, Vienna (2012); Tate St Ives, Cornwall (2011); the Power Plant, Toronto (2008); Städtischen Kunstmuseum zum Museum Folkwang, Essen (2007); Kunstmuseum Basel Museum für Gegenwartskunst (2005); Museum of Modern Art, Sydney (2002); Portikus, Frankfurt (2002); UCLA Hammer Museum, Los Angeles (2002); Kunstverein Hamburg (2001); Vienna Secession (2001), Museu Serralves, Porto (2000); Camden Arts Centre, London (1998); and the Moderna Museet, Stockholm (1998), among others. In 2003, the artist represented Scotland at the 50th Venice Biennial.

Personal life
Starling lives and works in Copenhagen and Berlin, and was a professor of art at the Städelschule in Frankfurt am Main.

He was awarded 'Alumnus of the Year' by Nottingham Trent University in 2007.

See also
Turner Prize
Conceptual art

References

External links
 Elaine YJ Zheng: Simon Starling: 'A-A';B-B''
The Modern Institute: Simon Starling
 Turner Prize 2005: Simon Starling
 Guggenheim: Simon Starling
 Guardian interview (12/2005)
 frieze review (10/2005)
 Casey Kaplan: Simon Starling
 Franco Noero: Simon Starling
Tate: TateShots: Simon Starling at Tate St Ives. 2011.

Bibliography 
 Interview with Fabian Stech in ANNUAL MAGAZINE No., 2012 p. 143-146.  
 Dieter Roelstraete, Francesco Manacorda, Janet Harbord, Simon Starling, Phaidon Press, London, 2012. 

1967 births
Living people
British conceptual artists
English expatriates in Denmark
Alumni of Nottingham Trent University
People from Epsom
Alumni of the Glasgow School of Art
Turner Prize winners
English contemporary artists